The Städtische Verkehrsbetriebe Bern (SVB) is a public transport operator in and around the Swiss capital city of Bern. It is also known by its marketing name of BERNMOBIL, and operates the city's network of trams, trolleybuses and motor buses. It was formed in 1947 by the merger of the Städtische Strassenbahn Bern (SSB), which operated trams and trolleybuses, with the Stadt-Omnibus Bern (SOB), which ran motor buses.

See also 
 Trams in Bern
 Trolleybuses in Bern

External links
 Bernmobil
 Tram Travels: Bernmobil

Transport in Bern